Margarita Matulyan  (born on June 7, 1985 in Yerevan) is an Armenian artist, sculptor.

Career 
Margarita Matulyan was born in 1985 in Yerevan in the family of painter, Honored artist of Armenia Tigran Matulyan. She graduated from the Yerevan State Academy of Fine Arts. Since 2010 she is a member of Artists' Union of Armenia. Margarita works at "National Center of Aesthetics" as a sculpture educator of studio-college of fine arts. Since 2012 Margarita Matulian's artworks are permanently exposed at Arame Art Gallery, Yerevan, Armenia.

Margarita creates bronze, copper, paper sculptures.

Solo exhibitions
 Exhibition of bronze statues, Albert & Tov Boyajian Gallery,  Yerevan, 2006
 "Paper Statues", Academia Gallery, Yerevan, 2010
 Exhibition at the Armenian Embassy to Denmark,  Copenhagen, Denmark, 2016

Group exhibitions
 "Nouneh Tumanyan and Students", Albert & Tov Boyajian Gallery; Yerevan, 2007
 Exhibition-contest devoted to the 15th anniversary of liberation of Shoushi, National Gallery of Armenia, Yerevan, 2007
 Exhibition-contest of young artists devoted to St.Sargis day Artists' Union of Armenia, Yerevan, 2009
 Exhibition devoted to the 8th of March, Artists' Union of Armenia,  Yerevan, 2009
 National exhibition Graphics and Sculpture, Artists' Union of Armenia, Yerevan, 2009
 National exhibition of young artists, contest devoted to St.Sargis day (Received the 2nd prize) Artists' Union of Armenia,  Yerevan, 2010
 National Exhibition devoted to the 8th of March Artists' Union of Armenia, Yerevan, 2010
 Exhibition devoted to the 19th anniversary of NKR Independence, 2010
 Exhibition devoted to the 8th of march Artists’ Union,  Yerevan, 2011
 Group Exhibition, Artists' Union of Armenia. Yerevan, 2011
 Exhibition devoted to the 8th of march Artists’ Union, Yerevan, 2012
 Group Exhibition , "Arame" Art Gallery,  Yerevan, 2012
 Group Exhibition, Artists' Union of Armenia, Yerevan, 2012
 Exhibition, Arame Art Gallery, 2012
 Exhibition in Bairut Souks, Arame Art Gallery. Beirut, Lebanon, 2013
 Exhibition devoted to the 8th of march Artists’ Union; Yerevan, 2014
 Group Exhibition, Arame Art Gallery, Yerevan, 2014
 Group Exhibition, Artists' Union of Armenia, Yerevan, 2014
 Group Exhibition, "Beauty in the Palm", Arame Art Gallery, Beirut, Lebanon, 2014
 Group Exhibition, Artists' Union of Armenia, Yerevan, 2015
 Group Exhibition, Dance  Artists' Union of Armenia, Yerevan, 2015
 Exhibition devoted to the 8th of march Artists’ Union,  Yerevan, 2016

Gallery

See also
List of Armenian artists
List of Armenians
Culture of Armenia

References

External links

Young winners 2014, Margarita Matulyan
Women Sculptors

1985 births
Armenian sculptors
Living people
Artists from Yerevan
Armenian women painters
Armenian women sculptors